The 2013 European Youth Summer Olympic Festival was held in Utrecht, Netherlands, between 14 and 19 July 2013.

Sports
There were contested nine sports:

Venues

Schedule
The competition schedule for the 2017 European Youth Olympic Summer Festival is as follows:

Participant nations

Medal table

References

External links

Results

 
European Youth Summer Olympic Festival
European Youth Summer Olympic Festival 2013
European Youth Summer Olympic Festival
Youth Summer Olympic Festival
European Youth Summer Olympic Festival
Multi-sport events in the Netherlands
Youth sport in the Netherlands
2013 in youth sport
July 2013 sports events in Europe
Sports competitions in Utrecht (city)